Brad Miller (born July 23, 1969) is a Canadian former professional ice hockey player. He played 82 games in the National Hockey League (NHL) with the Buffalo Sabres, Ottawa Senators, and Calgary Flames between 1988 and 1993. The rest of his career, which lasted from 1988 to 2000, was spent in the minor leagues.

Playing career
Miller was drafted in the second round, 22nd overall, by the Buffalo Sabres in the 1987 NHL Entry Draft. In his career, Miller played 82 games in the NHL. He scored one goal and added five assists.

Career statistics

Regular season and playoffs

External links
 

1969 births
Living people
Atlanta Knights players
Buffalo Sabres draft picks
Buffalo Sabres players
Calgary Flames players
Canadian expatriate ice hockey players in the United States
Canadian ice hockey defencemen
Las Vegas Thunder players
Minnesota Moose players
New Haven Senators players
Ottawa Senators players
Quebec Rafales players
Regina Pats players
Rochester Americans players
Saint John Flames players
St. John's Maple Leafs players
San Antonio Dragons players
Ice hockey people from Edmonton
Utah Grizzlies (IHL) players